Metoposauridae is an extinct family of trematosaurian temnospondyls. The family is known from the Triassic period. Metoposaurids can be distinguished from the very similar mastodonsauroids by the position of their eyes, placed far forward on the snout.

Taphonomy
Several mass accumulations of metoposaurid fossils are known from the southwestern United States and Morocco. These have often been interpreted as the result of mass deaths from droughts. Many individuals would have died in one area, creating a dense bone bed once fossilized. These mass accumulations of metoposaurids are often dominated by one taxa, such as Anaschisma or Metoposaurus. Recent sedimentological studies suggest that the mass accumulations were not the result of droughts, but of river currents carrying remains. Most skeletons in these accumulations are disarticulated, suggesting they were transported by water to the deposition sites. The large gatherings of metoposaurids may have been breeding sites, and were probably common across floodplains in Late Triassic Pangaea.

References

External links
Metoposauridae at The Paleobiology Database.

Triassic temnospondyls
Trematosaurs
Amphibian families